The Rencontres d’Arles (formerly called Rencontres internationales de la photographie d’Arles) is an annual summer photography festival founded in 1970 by the Arles photographer Lucien Clergue, the writer Michel Tournier and the historian Jean-Maurice Rouquette.

The Rencontres d’Arles has an international reputation for showing material that has never been seen by the public before. In 2015, the festival welcomed 93,000 visitors; in 2016, the 100,000 visitor mark was reached.

Specially designed exhibitions, often organised in collaboration with French and foreign museums and institutions, take place in various historic sites. Some venues, such as 12th-century chapels or 19th-century industrial buildings, are open to the public throughout the festival.

The Rencontres d’Arles has launched the careers of numerous photographers, confirming its significance as a springboard for photography and contemporary creativity. In recent years the Rencontres d’Arles has invited many guest curators and entrusted some of its programming to prominent figures in the world of art and photography, such as Martin Parr in 2004, Raymond Depardon in 2006, the Arles-born fashion designer Christian Lacroix in 2008 and Nan Goldin in 2009.

The 51st edition of the festival was cancelled due to the COVID-19 pandemic, but the winners of the 2020 awards were nevertheless announced.

Art directors

 1970 – 1972: Lucien Clergue, Michel Tournier, Jean-Maurice Rouquette
 1973 – 1976: Lucien Clergue
 1977: Bernard Perrine
 1978: Jacques Manachem
 1979 – 1982: Alain Desvergnes
 1983 – 1985: Lucien Clergue
 1986 – 1987: François Hébel
 1988 – 1989: Claude Hudelot
 1990: Agnès de Gouvion Saint-Cyr
 1991 – 1993: 
 1994: Lucien Clergue
 1995 – 1998, délégué général: 
 1995, artistic director: 
 1996, artistic director: Joan Fontcuberta
 1997, artistic director: 
 1998, artistic director: Giovanna Calvenzi
 1999 – 2001: Gilles Mora
 2002 – 2014: François Hébel
 Since 2015:

The festival

Events 
Opening week at the Rencontres d’Arles features photography-focused events (projections at night, exhibition tours, panel discussions, symposia, parties, book signings, etc.) in the town's historic venues, some of which are only open to the public during the festival.
Memorable events in recent years include Europe Night (2008), an overview of European photography; Christian Lacroix's fashion show for the festival's closing (2008); and Patti Smith's concert for the Vu agency's 20th anniversary (2006).

Nights at the Roman Theatre 
At night, work by a photographer or a photography expert is projected in the town's open-air Roman theatre accompanied by concerts and performances. Each event is a one-off creation.
In 2009, 8,500 people attended evenings at the Roman theatre, an average of 2,000 a night, and 2,500 were there on closing night, when the Tiger Lilies played during a projection of Nan Goldin's “The Ballad of Sexual Dependency”.
In 2013 over 6,000 people attended the nighttime photography projections, an average of approximately 1,000 each night.

The Night of the Year 
The Night of the Year, which was created in 2006, allows visitors to walk around and see the festival's favourite works by artists and photographers as well as carte blanche exhibitions by institutions.

Cosmos-Arles Books 
Cosmos-Arles Books is a Rencontres d’Arles satellite event dedicated to new publishing practices.

Over the past 15 years large-scale photographic publications, self-published books, and ebooks have become essential media for experimentation by photographers and artists. They allow photography to be rediscovered as a means of expression and distribution, providing a rich terrain of expression for the art's fundamentally hybrid forms.

Symposia and panel discussions 
Photographers and professionals participating in symposia and panel discussions during opening week discuss their work or issues raised by the images on display.

In recent years the themes included whether a black-and-white aesthetic is still conceivable in photography (2013); the impact of social networks on creativity and information (2011); breaking with past, a key idea for photography today (2009); photography commissions: freedom or constraint (2008); challenges and changes in the photography market (2007).

The Rencontres d’Arles awards 
Since 2002 the Rencontres d’Arles awards have been an opportunity to discover new talents. In 2007 the number of annual awards was reduced to three, presented at the closing ceremony of the festival's professional week: the Discovery Award (€25,000), Author's Book Award (€8,000) and History Book Award (€8,000).

Luma Rencontres Dummy Book Award 
In 2015 the Rencontres d’Arles offered an award to assist with the publication of a dummy book. Endowed with a €25,000 budget production budget, this new prize is open to all photographers and artists using photography who submit a dummy book that has never been published.

The winner's book will be produced in autumn 2015 and be presented at the 2016 Rencontres d’Arles.

Photo Folio Review & Gallery 
Since 2006 aspiring photographers have been able to submit their portfolios to international photography experts in various fields, including publishers, exhibition curators, heads of institutions, agency directors, gallery owners, collectors, critics and photo editors, for appraisal during the festival's opening week. Photo Folio Review & Gallery offers them an opportunity to show their work throughout the festival.

Photography classes 
The Rencontres d’Arles has always been a place where professional photographers and practitioners on every level have been able to meet each other and exchange ideas. Each year, photography class participants undertake a personal journey of creation through photography's aesthetic, ethical and technological issues. Leading photographers such as Guy le Querrec, Antoine d’Agata, Martin Parr, René Burri and Joan Fontcuberta regularly teach at the Rencontres d’Arles.

Rentrée en Images 
“Rentrée en Images” has been a key part of the festival's educational activities since 2004. During the first two weeks in September, special mediators take students from the primary to graduate school level on guided tours of the exhibitions. Based on the festival's programming, the event aims to introduce young people to the visual arts and fits in with a wider policy of cultural democratisation. “Rentrée en Images” reaches thousands of students, and for many of them it is their first exposure to contemporary art.

Women in Motion Photography Award 
In 2019, the Women in Motion Photography Award was launched in cooperation with Kering to honour photographs raising awareness on gender imbalance in photography.

Budget 
Public funding accounted for 40% of the 2015 festival's €6.3-million budget, sales (mainly of tickets and derivative products), 40% and private partnerships, 20%.

Executive committee 
 Hubert Védrine, president
 Hervé Schiavetti, vice-president
 Jean-François Dubos, vice-president
 Marin Karmitz, treasurer
 Françoise Nyssen, secretary 
 Lucien Clergue, Jean-Maurice Rouquette, Michel Tournier, founding members

The Rencontres d'Arles award winners

2002 
 Jury: Denis Curti, Alberto Anault, Alice Rose George, Manfred Heiting, Erik Kessels, Claudine Maugendre, Val Williams
 Discovery Award: Peter Granser
 No Limit award: Jacqueline Hassink
 Dialogue of the humanity award: Tom Wood
 Photographer of the year award: Roger Ballen
 Help to the project: Pascal Aimar, Chris Shaw
 Author's Book Award: Sibusiso Mbhele and His Fish Helicopter by Koto Bolofo (powerHouse Books, 2002)
 Help to publishing: Une histoire sans nom by Anne-Lise Broyer

2003 
 Jury: Giovanna Calvenzi, Hou Hanru, Christine Macel, Anna Lisa Milella, Urs Stahel
 Discovery Award: Zijah Gafic
 No Limit award: Thomas Demand
 Dialogue of the humanity award: Fazal Sheikh
 Photographer of the year award: Anders Petersen
 Help to the project: Jitka Hanzlova
 Author's Book Award: Hide That Can by Deirdre O’Callaghan (Trolley Books, 2002)
 Help to publishing: A Personal Diary of Chinese Avant-Garde in the 1990s, China (1993–1998) by Xing Danwen

2004 
 Jury: Eikoh Hosoe, Joan Fontcuberta, Tod Papageorge, Elaine Constantine, Antoine d’Agata
 Discovery Award: Yasu Suzuka
 No Limit award: Jonathan de Villiers
 Dialogue of the humanity award: Edward Burtynsky
 Help to the project: John Stathatos
 Author's Book Award: Particulars by David Goldblatt (Goodman Gallery, 2003)

2005 
 Jury: Ute Eskildsen, Jean-Louis Froment, Michel Mallard, Kathy Ryan, Marta Gili
 Discovery Award: Miroslav Tichý
 No Limit award: Mathieu Bernard-Reymond
 Dialogue of the humanity award: Simon Norfolk
 Help to the project: Anna Malagrida
 Author's Book Award: Temporary Discomfort (Chapter I-V) by Jules Spinatsch (Lars Müller Publishers, 2005)

2006 
 Jury: Vincent Lavoie, Abdoulaye Konaté, Yto Barrada, Marc-Olivier Wahler, Alain d’Hooghe
 Discovery Award: Alessandra Sanguinetti
 No Limit award: Randa Mirza
 Dialogue of the humanity award: Wang Qingsong
 Help to the project: Walid Raad
 Author's Book Award: Form aus Licht und Schatten by Heinz Hajek-Halke (Steidl, 2005)

2007 

 Jury: Bice Curiger, Alain Fleischer, Johan Sjöström, Thomas Weski, Anne Wilkes Tucker
 Discovery Award: Laura Henno
 Author's Book Award: Empty Bottles by WassinkLundgren (Thijs groot Wassink and Ruben Lundgren) (Veenman Publishers, 2007)
 Historical Book Award: László Moholy-Nagy: Color in Transparency: Photographic Experiments in Color, 1934–1946 by Jeannine Fiedler (Steidl & Bauhaus-Archiv, 2006)

2008 

 Jury: Elisabeth Biondi, Luis Venegas, Nathalie Ours, Caroline Issa and Massoud Golsorkhi, Carla Sozzani
 Discovery Award: Pieter Hugo
 Author's Book Award: Strange and Singular by Michael Abrams (Loosestrife, 2007)
 Historical Book Award: Nein, Onkel: Snapshots from Another Front 1938–1945 by Ed Jones and Timothy Prus (Archive of Modern Conflict, 2007)

2009 

 Jury: Lucien Clergue, Bernard Perrine, Alain Desvergnes, Claude Hudelot, Agnès de Gouvion Saint-Cyr, Louis Mesplé, Bernard Millet, Michel Nuridsany, Joan Fontcuberta, Christian Caujolle, Giovanna Calvenzi, Martin Parr, Christian Lacroix, Arnaud Claass, Christian Milovanoff
 Discovery Award: Rimaldas Viksraitis
 Author's Book Award: From Back Home by Anders Petersen and JH Engström (Bokförlaget Max Ström, 2009)
 Historical Book Award: In History by Susan Meiselas (Steidl and International Center of Photography, 2008)

2010 

 Discovery Award: Taryn Simon
 LUMA award: Trisha Donnelly
 Author's Book Award: Photography 1965–74 by Yutaka Takanashi (Only Photograph, 2010)
 Historical Book Award: Les livres de photographies japonais des années 1960 et 1970 by Ryuichi Kaneko and Ivan Vartanian (Seuil, 2009)

2011 

 Discovery Award: Mikhael Subotzky and Patrick Waterhouse
 Author's Book Award: A Living Man Declared Dead and Other Chapters by Taryn Simon (Mack, 2011)
 Historical Book Award: Works by Lewis Baltz (Steidl, 2010)

2012 

 Discovery Award: Jonathan Torgovnik
 Author's Book Award: Redheaded Peckerwood by Christian Patterson (Mack, 2011)
 Historical Book Award: Les livres de photographie d’Amérique latine by Horacio Fernández (Images en Manœuvres Éditions, 2011)

2013 
 Discovery Award: Yasmine Eid-Sabbagh and Rozenn Quéré
 Author's Book Award: Anticorps by Antoine d’Agata (Xavier Barral & Le Bal, 2013)
 Historical Book Award: AOI [COD.19.1.1.43] – A27 [S | COD.23 by Rosângela Rennó (Self-published, 2013)

2014 
 Discovery Award: Zhang Kechun
 Author's Book Award: Hidden Islam by Nicolò Degiorgis (Rorhof, 2014)
 Historical Book Award: Paris mortel retouché by Johan van der Keuken (Van Zoetendaal Publishers, 2013)

2015 
 Discovery Award: Pauline Fargue
 Author's Book Award: H. said he loved us by Tommaso Tanini (Discipula Editions, 2014)
 Historical Book Award: Monograph Vitas Luckus. Works & Biography by Margarita Matulytė and Tatjana Luckiene-Aldag (Kaunas Photography Gallery and Lithuanian Art Museum, 2014)
 Dummy Book Award: The Jungle Book by Yann Gross
 Photo Folio Review: Piero Martinelo (winner); Charlotte Abramow, Martin Essi, Elin Høyland, Laurent Kronenthal (special mentions)

2016 

 Discovery Award: Sarah Waiswa
 Author's Book Award: Taking Off. Henry My Neighbor by Mariken Wessels (Art Paper Editions, 2015)
 Historical Book Award: (in matters of) Karl by Annette Behrens (Fw: Books, 2015)
 Photo-Text Award: Negative Publicity: Artefacts of Extraordinary Rendition by Edmund Clark and Crofton Black (Aperture, 2015)
 Dummy Book Award: You and Me: A project between Bosnia, Germany and the US by Katja Stuke and Oliver Sieber
 Photo Folio Review: David Fathi (winner); Sonja Hamad, Eric Leleu, Karolina Paatos, Maija Tammi (special mentions)
 Laureate Award: A History of Misogyny Chapter One: Abortion by Laia Abril

2017 
 Discovery Award: Carlos Ayesta and Guillaume Bression
 Author's Book Award: Ville de Calais by Henk Wildschut (self-published, 2017) 
 Special Mention for Author's Book Award: Gaza Works by Kent Klich (Koenig, 2017)
 Historical Book Award: Latif Al Ani by Latif Al Ani (Hannibal Publishing, 2017)
 Photo-Text Award: The Movement of Clouds around Mount Fuji by Masanao Abe and Helmut Völter (Spector Books, 2016)
 Dummy Book Award: Grozny: Nine Cities by Olga Kravets, Maria Morina, and Oksana Yushko
 Photo Folio Review: Aurore Valade (winner); Haley Morris Cafiero, Alexandra Lethbridge, Charlotte Abramow, Catherine Leutenegger (special mentions)

2018 

 Discovery Award: Paulien Oltheten
 Author's Book Award: Photographic Treatment by Laurence Aëgerter (Dewi Lewis Publishing, 2017)
 Special Mention for Author's Book Award: The Iceberg by Giorgio di Noto (Edition Patrick Frey, 2017)
 Historical Book Award: The Pigeon Photographer by Julius Neubronner (Rorhof, 2017)
 Photo-Text Award: War Primer 2 by Adam Broomberg and Oliver Chanarin (Mack Books, 2018)
 Dummy Book Award: Phénomènes by Marina Gadonneix
 Special Mention for Dummy Book Award: State of Shame by Indrė Urbonaitė
 Photo Folio Review: Kurt Tong (winner)

2019 
 Discovery Award: Máté Bartha and Laure Tiberghien
 Audience Discovery Award: Alys Tomlinson
 Author's Book Award: The Pillar by Stephen Gill (Nobody, 2019)
 Historical Book Award: Enghelab Street, a Revolution through Books: Iran 1979–1983 by Hannah Darabi (Spector Books and Le Bal, 2019)
 Photo-Text Book Award: Dandaka by Vasantha Yogananthan (Chose Commune, 2018)
 Special Mention for Photo-Text Book Award: Parce Que by Sophie Calle (Éditions Xavier Barral, 2018)
 Dummy Book Award: The Poverty Line by Chow and Lin
 Photo Folio Review: Anna Lim (winner)

See also
Visa pour l'Image

References

External links

Leica Oskar Barnack Award, awarded by Leica Camera AG at Rencontres Internationales de la Photographie

Photography in France
Arles
Photography exhibitions
Photography festivals
Arts festivals in France
Art festivals in France